Norman Randall Legge (born December 16, 1945) is a Canadian retired professional ice hockey defenceman who played 12 games in the National Hockey League for the New York Rangers.  He also played 192 games in the World Hockey Association with the Michigan Stags/Baltimore Blades, Winnipeg Jets, Cleveland Crusaders, and San Diego Mariners.

External links
 

1945 births
Living people
Baltimore Blades players
Canadian ice hockey defencemen
Cleveland Crusaders players
Guelph Royals players
Ice hockey people from Ontario
Michigan Stags players
New York Rangers players
Sportspeople from Newmarket, Ontario
San Diego Mariners players
Winnipeg Jets (WHA) players